Filip Đuričić (born 30 January 1992) is a Serbian professional footballer who plays as an attacking midfielder for Italian  club Sampdoria and the Serbia national team.

Club career

Early career
Đuričić began playing football at local side Obrenovac 1905, before joining Red Star Belgrade's youth system. In 2007, he moved abroad to Greece and spent a year with Olympiacos. After Olympiacos, he played senior football at his hometown club Radnički Obrenovac in the third-tier Serbian League Belgrade (15 games and 3 goals in the 2008–09 season), before joining Heerenveen in January 2010. He made his debut for them on 20 February against Waalwijk and made an assist.

Benfica
On 23 February 2013, it was confirmed that Đuričić, along with fellow national team player Miralem Sulejmani, had passed medical tests and committed to a five-year contract with Benfica from summer 2013; with the Portuguese club spending €6 million to secure his services. A week later, Benfica revealed that the contract which Đuričić had signed contained a release clause which valued him at €40 million. Đuričić made his debut for Benfica on 18 August 2013, where he scored his first goal against Anderlecht in the UEFA Champions League.

Loans
Used sparsely throughout the season, Đuričić was loaned to Mainz 05 for one season on 23 July 2014, with the option to make the move permanent for €12.5 million. He made his debut at Mainz on 15 August 2014 in a DFB-Pokal match against Chemnitzer FC. On 2 February 2015, Đuričić was loaned to Premier League side Southampton until the end of the season. On 25 January 2016, he joined Belgian club Anderlecht on loan until June.

Sampdoria
After initially joining Sampdoria on loan until the end of the 2016–17 season in summer 2016, Đuričić signed permanently in January 2017. His contract with Sampdoria expired in the summer of 2018.

Sassuolo
In late June 2018, Đuričić signed a four-year contract with Sassuolo. In October 2019, his form improved under coach Roberto De Zerbi, scoring a goal in a 4–3 loss to Inter Milan on 20 October 2019 and another one five days later in a 1–0 win against Hellas Verona.

Return to Sampdoria
On 1 August 2022, Đuričić returned to Sampdoria on a two-year contract with an option to extend.

International career
Đuričić made his debut for the Serbian national team on 29 February 2012 in a friendly match against Cyprus. On 11 September 2012, he scored his first goal for his country's senior selection against Wales in the 2014 FIFA World Cup qualifying.

In November 2022, he was selected in Serbia's squad for the 2022 FIFA World Cup in Qatar. He played in group stage matches against Cameroon and Switzerland. Serbia finished fourth in the group.

Career statistics

Club

International

Scores and results list Serbia's goal tally first, score column indicates score after each Đuričić goal.

Honours
Benfica
Primeira Liga: 2013–14
Taça de Portugal: 2013–14
Taça da Liga: 2013–14

References

External links

 
 
 

1992 births
Living people
People from Obrenovac
Serbian footballers
Association football forwards
Serbia international footballers
Serbia under-21 international footballers
FK Radnički Obrenovac players
SC Heerenveen players
S.L. Benfica footballers
1. FSV Mainz 05 players
Southampton F.C. players
R.S.C. Anderlecht players
U.C. Sampdoria players
Benevento Calcio players
U.S. Sassuolo Calcio players
Eredivisie players
Primeira Liga players
Bundesliga players
Premier League players
Belgian Pro League players
Serie A players
2022 FIFA World Cup players
Serbian expatriate footballers
Expatriate footballers in Greece
Serbian expatriate sportspeople in Greece
Expatriate footballers in the Netherlands
Serbian expatriate sportspeople in the Netherlands
Expatriate footballers in Portugal
Serbian expatriate sportspeople in Portugal
Expatriate footballers in Germany
Serbian expatriate sportspeople in Germany
Expatriate footballers in England
Serbian expatriate sportspeople in England
Expatriate footballers in Belgium
Serbian expatriate sportspeople in Belgium
Expatriate footballers in Italy
Serbian expatriate sportspeople in Italy